The Gospels, Acts and Paul give describe several resurrection appearances of Jesus. An overview is given below.

See also
Miraculous catch of fish

Post-resurrection appearances of Jesus